Padmanabhan Balaram is an Indian biochemist and a former director of the Indian Institute of Science in Bangalore, India. He is a recipient of the third highest Indian civilian honour of Padma Bhushan (2014) as well as the TWAS Prize (1994). He has been conferred the 2021 R. Bruce Merrifield Award by the American Peptide Society.

Education
Balaram received his bachelor's degree in Chemistry from Fergusson College, University of Pune followed by a master's degree from the Indian Institute of Technology, Kanpur and his PhD degree from Carnegie Mellon University with Aksel A. Bothner-By. After a postdoctoral stint at Harvard University with Nobel laureate Robert Burns Woodward, he returned to the Indian Institute of Science, where he has been ever since as a faculty member in the Molecular Biophysics Unit. He presently holds a Chaired Professorship at the National Center for Biological Sciences, Bangalore. During his PhD, Balaram studied the use of negative Nuclear Overhauser effect signals as probes of macromolecular conformations. As a postdoc with Woodword, Balaram worked on the synthesis of the antibiotic erythromycin.

Research
Balaram's main area of research has been the investigation of the structure, conformation, and biological activity of designed and natural peptides. To do this, he has extensively used techniques such as Nuclear Magnetic Resonance spectroscopy, Infrared spectroscopy, and Circular Dichroism, along with X-ray crystallography. He has been a major contributor to the evaluation of factors influencing the folding and conformations of designed peptides, and has investigated structural elements playing a key role in the formation of secondary structural motifs such as helices, beta turns, and sheets. Along with Isabella Karle, a frequent collaborator, he has also pioneered the use of alpha-amino isobutyric acid to induce and retain helicity and constrain peptide conformations.

Balaram has authored more than 400 research papers, and is a fellow of the Indian National Science Academy.

He was the editor of the journal Current Science until June 2013.

References

External links
Prof. Padmanabhan Balaram takes charge as new director of IISc
IIT Kanpur Alumni Page

Recipients of the Padma Shri in science & engineering
Living people
Harvard University people
Carnegie Mellon University alumni
IIT Kanpur alumni
Savitribai Phule Pune University alumni
Directors of the Indian Institute of Science
Year of birth missing (living people)
Fellows of the Indian National Science Academy
Fellows of the Indian Academy of Sciences
Recipients of the Padma Bhushan in science & engineering
Scientists from Bangalore
Indian biochemists
Academic staff of the Indian Institute of Science
20th-century Indian chemists
21st-century Indian chemists
TWAS laureates
Recipients of the Rajyotsava Award 2008